Since becoming a member of the Australian Football League (AFL) in 1995, there have been six senior coaches of the Fremantle Football Club. To qualify, coaches must have coached the club in at least one senior AFL match. A senior AFL match is an Australian rules football match between two clubs that are, or were at the time of the match, members of the AFL. A senior AFL match is played under the laws of Australian football, and includes regular season matches, as well as finals series matches. It does not include pre-season competition matches, interstate matches or international rules football matches. The list is arranged in the order in which each coach first coached a game for Fremantle in a senior AFL match.

The Fremantle Women's football team has played in the AFL Women's league since its inauguration in 2017. Michelle Cowan was the inaugural coach, before her resignation in April 2017. Trent Cooper will coach the team in the 2019 AFL Women's season.

Coaches 
Statistics current to end of Round 7 of the 2022 AFL season

Key

Notes 
Ben Allan was appointed caretaker coach for the remainder of the 2001 season but had declared that he had no intention of applying for the senior coach's job for the 2002 season, and Chris Connolly was appointed at the end of the 2001 season.
Mark Harvey (then an assistant coach at FFC) was appointed caretaker coach for the remainder of the 2007 season, and as a result of his success (four wins from his seven matches), he was given the permanent position as Fremantle's coach.
 Mark Harvey was sacked in controversial circumstances at the end of the 2011 season, with a year left on his contract, in a surprise move that saw Ross Lyon resign from St Kilda to take up the post.
 David Hale coached the final round of the 2019 AFL season after Ross Lyon was sacked as coach.
 Jaymie Graham was appointed the fill-in coach for the Round 3 and 4 matches in 2022 when Justin Longmuir was required to isolate at home after being declared a close contact of a positive Covid-19 case.

References 
General

Specific

Australian rules football records and statistics

Fremantle Football Club coaches
Fremantle Football Club coaches
Fremantle-related lists